Auf Wiedersehn is a German-language studio album by Greek singer Demis Roussos, released in 1974 on Philips Records.

Commercial performance 
The album reached no. 7 in the Netherlands.

Track listing 
Produced by Leo Leandros.

Charts

References

External links 
 Demis Roussos – Auf Wiedersehn at Discogs
 Demis Roussos – Auf Wiedersehn (8-track cartridge) at Discogs

1974 albums
Demis Roussos albums
Philips Records albums
Albums produced by Leo Leandros